Ó Cianáin was the name of a Gaelic-Irish Brehon family. They were originally erenaghs of the parish of Cleenish, Lough Erne, but who had served for several centuries as historians to Mag Uidir of Fear Manach (2007, p. 437).

The Annals of Ulster record the death of Giolla na Naomh Ó Cianáin, abbot of Lis Gabhail (Lisgoole), on 12 August 1345 (actually 1348).

One of the family's most noted productions was Leabhar Adhamh Ó Cianáin, written in or about the 1340s by Adhamh Ó Cianáin (died 1373) by and for himself, and out of the book of his teacher, Seán Mór Ó Dubhagáin (died 1372).

The Annals of the Four Masters cite the deaths of members of the family under the years 1348, 1373, 1387, 1400, 1405, 1459, 1569, 1483.

The surname is anglicised as Keenan.

See also

 Adhamh Ó Cianáin, died 1373
 Eoghain Ó Cianáin (fl. 1540) harper and servant of Gerald FitzGerald, 9th Earl of Kildare
 Tadhg Ó Cianáin/Tadhg Óg Ó Cianáin,  writer, died Rome, November/December 1614.
 Cú Chonnacht Ó Cianáin, d. 1615, was a rymer or chronicler to Rory Maguire.
 Thady Ó Cianáin, composer, fl. 17th century
 Owen Keenan, harper, born 1725
 John Keenan (Medal of Honor), 1840s-1906
 Brian Keenan (Irish republican), IRA, 1942–2008
 Brian Keenan (musician), 1943–85
 Paddy Keenan, born 1950), uilleann piper
 Brian Keenan (writer), born 1951, kidnap victim
 Brigid Keenan, author and journalist

Sources

 The Learned Family of Ó Cianáin/Keenan, by Nollaig Ó Muraíle, in Clogher Record, pp. 396–402, 2005.
 http://www.irishtimes.com/ancestor/surname/index.cfm?fuseaction=Go.&UserID=

Irish families
Irish Brehon families
Surnames of Irish origin
Irish-language surnames
Families of Irish ancestry
Roman Catholic families